The 1991 Deutsche Tourenwagen Meisterschaft was the eighth season of premier German touring car championship and also sixth season under the moniker of Deutsche Tourenwagen Meisterschaft. The season had twelve rounds with two races each.

The winner was Frank Biela in Audi V8 quattro with 174 points.

Teams and drivers

Schedule and results

Championship standings

References

Deutsche Tourenwagen Masters seasons
1991 in German motorsport